Miho Miyahara (宮原 美穂, Miyahara Miho, born 3 September 1996) is a Japanese karateka. She is a two-time gold medalist in the women's kumite 50 kg event at the World Karate Championships (2018 and 2021). She also won the gold medal in this event at the 2018 Asian Karate Championships.

She represented Japan at the 2020 Summer Olympics in Tokyo, Japan in karate. She competed in the women's 55 kg event.

Career 

She won the silver medal in the women's 50 kg event at the 2016 World Karate Championships held in Linz, Austria. In the final, she lost against Alexandra Recchia of France. In 2017, she repeated this result with the silver medal in the women's kumite 50 kg event at the World Games in Wrocław, Poland. The gold medal also went to Alexandra Recchia.

At the 2018 Asian Karate Championships held in Amman, Jordan, she won the gold medal in the women's kumite 50 kg event. A few days later, she won the gold medal in the women's kumite 50 kg event at the 2018 World University Karate Championships held in Kobe, Japan. A month later, she won one of the bronze medals in the women's kumite 50 kg event at the 2018 Asian Games held in Jakarta, Indonesia.

At the 2019 Asian Karate Championships held in Tashkent, Uzbekistan, she won the silver medal in the women's kumite 50 kg event. In the final, she lost against Bakhriniso Babaeva of Uzbekistan.

In August 2021, at the 2020 Summer Olympics in Tokyo, Japan, she competed in the women's 55 kg event. In November 2021, she won the gold medal in the women's 50 kg event at the World Karate Championships held in Dubai, United Arab Emirates. She defeated Shara Hubrich of Germany in her gold medal match.

She won the bronze medal in the women's 50 kg event at the 2022 World Games held in Birmingham, United States. She defeated Gu Shiau-shuang of Chinese Taipei in her bronze medal match.

Achievements

References

External links 
 

Living people
1996 births
Sportspeople from Fukuoka (city)
Japanese female karateka
Karateka at the 2018 Asian Games
Medalists at the 2018 Asian Games
Asian Games medalists in karate
Asian Games bronze medalists for Japan
Competitors at the 2017 World Games
Competitors at the 2022 World Games
World Games silver medalists
World Games medalists in karate
Karateka at the 2020 Summer Olympics
Olympic karateka of Japan
21st-century Japanese women